= Dhok Allahdad Khan =

- Town
- Location within Pakistan
- Coordinates: 33.15°N 73.22°E
- Country: Pakistan
- Province: (Islamabad Capital Territory) Islamabad C.T
- Elevation: 457 m (1,499 ft)
- Time zone: UTC+5 (PST)

Dhok Allahdad Khan is a town in the Islamabad Capital Territory of Pakistan. It is located at 33° 15' 58N 73° 22' 5E with an altitude of 457 metres (1502 feet).
